In Colorado, State Highway 225 may refer to:
Interstate 225, the only Colorado highway numbered 225 since 1968
Colorado State Highway 225 (1938-1953) south of Limon